Frodingham TMD is a traction maintenance depot located in Frodingham, Scunthorpe, England. The depot is situated on the northern side of the South Humberside Main Line and is to the east of Scunthorpe station.

The depot code is FH.

History 
From 1958 to 1991, Class 08 shunters and Class 10 locomotives could be seen at the depot. Until 1987, the depot had an allocation of Class 08 shunters. Around 1987, Classes 20, 31, 37, 45, 47 and 56 locomotives could also be seen stabled at the depot.

Present 
The site was taken over by GrantRail in 1999.  In 2004 the old depot building was demolished.  A new depot was built nearby and is now operated by VolkerRail (pka GrantRail) for maintenance of on-track machines and road-railers.

References

Bibliography

Railway depots in England
Rail transport in Lincolnshire